Hedwig of Sweden - Swedish: Hedvig - may refer to:

Hedwig of Holstein, Queen consort of Sweden 1276 usually called Haelwig (Helvig) which is another name
Hedvig Eleonora of Holstein-Gottorp, Queen consort of Sweden 1654
Hedvig Elisabeth Charlotte of Holstein-Gottorp, Queen consort of Sweden 1809, officially named Charlotte
Hedwig Sophia, Princess of Sweden 1681